Be with Me is a 2005 Singaporean drama film.

Be with Me may also refer to:

 "Be with Me" (The Beach Boys song), 1969
 "Be with Me" (J. Holiday song), 2006

See also
 "B with Me", 2002 Mis-Teeq song